Horse Hollow is a valley in Shannon County in the U.S. state of Missouri.

Horse Hollow was named for the fact horses were corralled in the valley to prevent theft.

References

Valleys of Shannon County, Missouri
Valleys of Missouri